New Creek is an unincorporated community in Mineral County, West Virginia, United States. The ZIP code for New Creek is 26743.

During the Civil War, this community was the site of a military skirmish between Union  and Confederate troops on June 19, 1861.

References 

Unincorporated communities in Mineral County, West Virginia
Unincorporated communities in West Virginia
Northwestern Turnpike